Agonopterix leucadensis is a moth of the family Depressariidae. It is found in Greece.

References

External links
lepiforum.de

Moths described in 1932
Agonopterix
Moths of Europe